El Cantor de Buenos Aires is a 1940 Argentine film.

Cast

External links
 

1940 films
1940s Spanish-language films
Argentine black-and-white films
1940 musical films
Films shot in Buenos Aires
Films set in Buenos Aires
Argentine musical films
1940s Argentine films